Terrassa Padovana is a comune (municipality) in the Province of Padua in the Italian region Veneto, located about  southwest of Venice and about  south of Padua.

Terrassa Padovana borders the following municipalities: Arre, Bovolenta, Candiana, Cartura, and Conselve.

Demographic evolution

References

Cities and towns in Veneto